The 1926 Nevada gubernatorial election was held on November 2, 1926. Republican nominee Fred B. Balzar defeated Democratic incumbent James G. Scrugham with 53.00% of the vote.

General election

Candidates
Fred B. Balzar, Republican 
James G. Scrugham, Democratic

Results

References

1926
Nevada
Gubernatorial